The 2019 Louisville Cardinals men's soccer team represented University of Louisville during the 2019 NCAA Division I men's soccer season.  The Cardinals were led by head coach John Michael Hayden, in his first season.  They played home games at Lynn Stadium.  This was the team's 41st season playing organized men's college soccer and their 6th playing in the Atlantic Coast Conference.

Background

The 2018 Louisville men's soccer team finished the season with a 11–5–3 overall record and a 4–2–2 ACC record.  The Cardinals were seeded fourth–overall in the 2018 ACC Men's Soccer Tournament.  The Cardinals upset the number two seeded North Carolina Tar Heels and number one seeded Wake Forest Demon Deacons along the way to their first ACC Men's Soccer Tournament title.  The Cardinals earned an automatic bid into the 2018 NCAA Division I Men's Soccer Tournament for winning the ACC Tournament.  As the fourth–overall seed in the tournament, Louisville was defeated by Michigan State in the Second Round.

At the end of the season, one Cardinal men's soccer player was selected in the 2019 MLS SuperDraft: Adam Wilson.

Head Coach Ken Lolla resigned after 13 years and a 155–77–39 record with the team. He was replaced by John Michael Hayden on December 27, 2018

Player movement

Players leaving

Players arriving

Squad

Roster

Updated August 19, 2019

Team management

Source:

Schedule

Source:

|-
!colspan=6 style=""| Exhibition

|-
!colspan=6 style=""| Regular Season

|-
!colspan=7 style=""| ACC Tournament

|-
!colspan=7 style=""| NCAA Tournament

Awards and honors

2020 MLS SuperDraft 

Source:

Rankings

References

2019
Louisville Cardinals
Louisville Cardinals
Louisville Cardinals men's soccer
Louisville Cardinals